"Is There Any Love in Your Heart" is a song by American singer Lenny Kravitz and released on November 22, 1993, as the fourth single from his third studio album, Are You Gonna Go My Way (1993). Following its release, the song reached the top 50 in Australia and New Zealand and peaked at number 19 on the US Billboard Album Rock Tracks chart. The song was later included on the Japanese edition of Kravitz' 2000 compilation album, Greatest Hits. The music video was directed by Mark Romanek and features Canadian model Ève Salvail playing a vampire.

Reception
James E. Perone in The Album: A Guide to Pop Music's Most Provocative, Influential, and Important Creations stated, "The Kravitz and Craig Ross collaboration 'Is There Any Love in Your Heart' re-creates the style of late 1960s' and early 1970s hard rock." Alan Sculley of The Crisis noted, "There is one particularly acidic track directed to gold diggers attracted by his celebrity status, "Is There Any Love in Your Heart."

Track listings

Charts

Uses
 The song was featured in the season 7 episode "Pumping Iron" of the MTV animated television series Beavis and Butt-Head.

References

External links
 

Lenny Kravitz songs
1993 songs
Music videos directed by Mark Romanek
Songs written by Craig Ross
Songs written by Lenny Kravitz